The Whirlwind is a 1933 American Pre-Code Western film directed by D. Ross Lederman and starring Tim McCoy.

Cast
 Tim McCoy as Tim Reynolds
 Alice Dahl as Mollie Curtis
 Pat O'Malley as Pat Patrick
 J. Carrol Naish as 'Injun' (as Carol Naish)
 Matthew Betz as Sheriff Tate Hurley
 Joseph W. Girard as Mr. Reynolds (as Joseph Girard)
 Mary Gordon as Mrs. Curtis

References

External links
 

1933 films
1933 Western (genre) films
American Western (genre) films
1930s English-language films
American black-and-white films
Films directed by D. Ross Lederman
Columbia Pictures films
1930s American films